Rishinaradamangalam is a small village near Kannambra in Alathur taluk of Palakkad district in Kerala.

It has one of the few temples dedicated to Narasimha Murthy. Rishinaradamangalam is one of the two villages which celebrate Kannambra Vela.

It is situated 5 km from Vadakkencherry NH 47 (Trissur - Palakkad Route).

References 

Villages in Palakkad district